Chu River (name in Vietnam) also known as the Nam Sam River or Nam Xam River  (name in Laos) is the largest tributary of Ma River. It originates from Houa peak at 2062m near Xam Neua town, Houaphanh Province in eastern Laos and travels east to meander through the Nghệ An and Thanh Hóa provinces of Vietnam. It joins Ma River on the left in Thiệu Hóa.

The river is 325 km long (165 km in Laos and 160 km in Vietnam) with a drainage area of about 7,580 km2 (4,570 km2 in Laos and 3,010 km2 in Vietnam).

Rivers of Laos
Rivers of Nghệ An province
Rivers of Thanh Hóa province
International rivers of Asia
Geography of Houaphanh province
Rivers of Vietnam